The Grant City station is a Staten Island Railway station in the neighborhood of Grant City, Staten Island, New York.

History 
The station opened on April 23, 1860, with the opening of the Staten Island Railway from Vanderbilt's Landing to Eltingville. Prior to 1965, the Grant City Station was at grade level. In 1964 construction began on eliminating the crossings from Jefferson Avenue to New Dorp. The tracks were displaced onto South Railroad Avenue and the station was relocated during the construction.

Station layout
Currently, the station is located on an open cut at Lincoln Avenue and Railroad Avenue on the main line. It has two side platforms and aqua green walls.

Exits
There are two exits; the main exit at the south end leads to Lincoln Avenue and has brick a station house on street level. There are 2 benches inside the stationhouse, each with three seats. The secondary exit at the middle of this station leads to Fremont Avenue on both sides with an overpass to connect both platforms.

References

External links

 Staten Island Railway station list
 Staten Island Railway general information
 Lincoln Avenue entrance from Google Maps Street View
 Fremont Avenue entrance from Google Maps Street View
 Platforms from Google Maps Street View

Staten Island Railway stations
Railway stations in the United States opened in 1860
1860 establishments in New York (state)